Charles L. Brown is a former water polo representative from New Zealand.

At the 1950 British Empire Games he won the silver medal as part of the men's water polo team.

References

Commonwealth Games silver medallists for New Zealand
New Zealand male water polo players
Water polo players at the 1950 British Empire Games
Living people
Year of birth missing (living people)
Commonwealth Games competitors for New Zealand